The 1974 Maine gubernatorial election took place on November 5, 1974. Incumbent Democratic Governor Kenneth M. Curtis was term-limited and could not seek re-election.  Independent candidate James B. Longley defeated Democratic Party challenger (and future Senate Majority Leader) George J. Mitchell and Republican James Erwin in a tight three-way contest.  Longley's victory made him the first independent (non-party-affiliated) governor in Maine's history.

Campaign

Democratic nominee

George Mitchell was an early front-runner for the governorship in 1974. He had defeated Joseph Brennan in the Democratic primary and had the backing of popular former governor (and then-U.S. Senator) Edmund Muskie.  Many Maine political observers believed Mitchell would be able to easily beat back the challenge from James Erwin and become Maine's next governor.

Mitchell ran on the campaign theme "There are two Maines. There should only be one." He argued that Maine was a gorgeous state with rich natural resources and was a thriving tourist destination, but at the same time it had high unemployment and a large number of Maine families lived below the poverty line. His campaign focused on ways to bring together the two Maines – a place with a protected environment and a strong economy.

Republican nominee
James Erwin of York, another early front-runner in the race, had served in the Maine House and Senate before winning his first of three terms as attorney general in 1967. In 1970, he had lost his first run for governor by 890 votes to the Democratic incumbent Curtis, and his campaign theme was "Erwin This Time." He defeated Harrison Richardson, also a state legislator, for the nomination.

According to his 2005 obituary, Erwin was "born in New York City and grew up in Englewood, N.J. He spent his summers on his mother's family's farm in South Berwick, which is now the site of Berwick Academy. He graduated from Dartmouth College and served in the Army during World War II."

Independent candidate
James B. Longley was the owner of a successful insurance agency in Lewiston, who got his first opportunity in statewide politics when then-Governor Curtis asked him to lead a state government commission called the Maine Management and Cost Survey Commission, which was intended to make government more efficient, and cut costs. After some initial reluctance, Longley accepted the position and pursued the job with vigor.

Longley made several recommendations that were projected to save the state in excess of $24 million. One of his major proposals included restructuring the Maine university system, which he felt was grossly inefficient. His work at the commission gave him a prominent statewide profile, something he decided to try to turn into an electoral mandate when Governor Curtis retired in 1974.

Longley had been a lifelong Democrat, but due to earning a maverick reputation acting in a non-partisan role on the cost-cutting commission and because he inadvertently missed the filing deadline for party candidates, he ran as an independent. Some Maine observers believed he knew he would be unable to beat both former Muskie adviser George Mitchell and state Senator Joseph Brennan in a Democratic primary, causing him to not file with the party. He ran on the slogan "Think About It", a phrase he often used with insurance customers to get them to consider his products.

The issues

In 1974, the economy was volatile and inflation was high. Maine's economy was in a weak position with high unemployment and low wages, and all three candidates focused on this economic uncertainty in their respective campaigns. Issues such as oil prices, health care, the environment and care for the elderly were also major themes that dominated the debate by the candidates.

Longley campaigned on a platform of cutting government and making it more efficient, hoping to capitalize on the reputation he had earned with the commission. However, he struggled to get attention in the race, as most media outlets focused on Mitchell and James Erwin (who had run for governor the previous cycle as well). Toward the tail end of the campaign, however, increased attention was focused on Longley, with newspapers profiling his candidacy and speculating that he was on par with the other two candidates. When the Bangor Daily News issued an endorsement of Longley, many observers believed it gave Longley instant legitimacy.

The election
An Associated Press poll three days before the election showed Mitchell and Erwin running neck and neck, with Longley trailing by double digits.  However, that same poll noted that 37 percent of the electorate was still undecided, leaving open the possibility that they could swing any direction at the last minute.

On Election Day, Longley won with 39 percent of the vote, followed by Mitchell at 36 percent, and Erwin with 23 percent.

Mitchell attributed his loss to "distrust and cynicism about politics and politicians", "widespread concern over the economy", and "the fact that James Longley had conducted a very excellent campaign."

Results

Notes

1974
Maine
Gubernatorial
November 1974 events in the United States